Various people of the Caucasus or Caucasian peoples live in Iran today. They include:

Immigrants from the South Caucasus and North Caucasus mainly due to policies of the Safavids and Qajars and to another significant extent due to the results of the 19th century Russo-Persian Wars and the Caucasian War:
Circassians (including the Abkhaz, Kabarday, Abazins, and Ubykh): Following the end of the Circassian insurgency in 1864 which triggered an exodus from North Caucasia, Circassian people had settled in small amounts in the territory of Iran. The Circassian population in Iran however for the vast majority stems from the Safavid and Qajar era. See also; Circassians in Iran
Dagestani people. Amongst them the Laks are the most well known.
Autochthonous people of South Caucasus:
speaking Kartvelian languages:
Georgians (Iranian Georgians): Christian Georgians were settled en masse in Iran's heartlands during the Safavid and Qajar era when the former ruled the Caucasus as part of its territories. Hundreds of thousands of Georgians were relocated by the Safavids starting from Shah Tahmasp I and most notably by shah Abbas I to various parts of Iran, including Isfahan, Mazandaran, and Gilan. A certain amount also migrated as muhajirs in the 19th century to Iran, following the Russian conquest of the Caucasus. This policy continued till the Qajar era, when Iran eventually lost its Caucasian territories to Russia in the course of the 19th century. (see Russo-Persian Wars) Nowadays all Iranian Georgians are reported to be Shia Muslims. The Georgians played a crucial role in developing Iran's industrial economy, strengthening its military, and populating newly built towns in various places in Iran.
Armenians (Iranian Armenians)
Azerbaijanis (Iranian Azerbaijanis)

See also
 Ethnic cleansing of Circassians
 Ayrums
 Peoples of the Caucasus in Turkey
 Persian Cossack Brigade
 Qajar dynasty#Migration of Caucasian Muslims
 Battle of Ganja (1804)#Immigration
 Qarapapaqs
 Gilaks
 Mazanderani people

References

Caucasus diasporas
Ethnic groups in Iran
Demographics of Iran
Ethnic groups in Georgia (country)
Peoples of the Caucasus